The Arbuckle Brook Formation is a geologic formation in Nova Scotia. It preserves fossils dating back to the Cambrian period.

See also 
 List of fossiliferous stratigraphic units in Nova Scotia

References 

Cambrian Nova Scotia
Cambrian south paleopolar deposits